Leino is an Estonian masculine given name and a Finnish surname. Notable people with the name include:

Given name
Leino Mägi (born 1955), Estonian politician
Leino Rei (born 1972), Estonian actor and theatre director

Surname
 Eino Leino (1878–1926), Finnish poet and journalist
 Ville Leino (born 1983), Finnish hockey player
 Yrjö Leino (1897–1961), Finnish politician

Estonian masculine given names
Finnish-language surnames